D.G. "Dick" Schutte (born 1947 in Wilsum, Overijssel) is a former Dutch politician. He is a member of the ChristianUnion and before that of the Reformatory Political Federation.

Schutte was mayor of Urk from 1999 to 2005. Previously he was an alderman of Oldebroek, a member of the provincial parliament of Gelderland, Flevoland and a civil servant.

From 2007 to 2019 (?) he was Chairperson of Christians for Israel, a Dutch Christian pro-Israel movement.

He is a member of the Netherlands Reformed Churches.

References

1947 births
Living people
20th-century Dutch civil servants
20th-century Dutch politicians
21st-century Dutch politicians
Aldermen in Gelderland
People from Oldebroek
Christian Union (Netherlands) politicians
Christian Zionists
Mayors in Flevoland
Members of the Provincial Council of Flevoland
Members of the Provincial Council of Gelderland
Netherlands Reformed Churches Christians from the Netherlands
People from Kampen, Overijssel
Reformatory Political Federation politicians
People from Urk